Bignonia binata is a flowering plant species in the genus Bignonia.

References

External links

binata
Plants described in 1821